Carla Arocha (born 30 October 1961) and Stéphane Schraenen (born 19 September 1971), also shortened to Arocha & Schraenen, are an artist duo that collaborates since 2006. Arocha & Schraenen work across media, producing paintings, drawings and prints. Large-scale mirrored and interactive sculptural installations are at the core of their collaborative project. Their abstract installations and sculptures stem from everyday objects. The artists strip such objects from functionality, thus reducing them to their basic essence and form. Engaging with the rich tradition of geometrical abstract and optical art, the artists’ works are often placed in a spatial context where light and reflection play a crucial role.

Education and early career
Carla Arocha is born in Venezuela (Caracas), Arocha grew up in a family of lawyers, whose interest in the humanities and culture had an impact on her education. Moreover, the rich legacy of modern and contemporary art of her home country Venezuela, with Jesús Rafael Soto, Carlos Cruz-Diez and Alejandro Otero, to name just a few, has left a profound impact on her as well as the architecture and public artworks scattered through the city of Caracas. In December 1979, she moved to Chicago where she studied biology at Saint Xavier University, Chicago, from which she obtained a Bachelor of Science (1986). After training as a biologist Carla Arocha radically changed course and steered her path to an artistic career, first studying for a Bachelor of Fine Arts, SAIC School of the Art Institute (1991) before pursuing her studies for a Master of Fine Arts, University of Illinois at Chicago (1994).

Stéphane Schraenen born in Belgium (Antwerp), studied Communication and Journalism at the AP Hogeschool Antwerpen (1992–1994) and studied Graphic Design at the Royal Academy of Fine Arts in Antwerp (1994–1996).

Arocha and Schraenen met in the late 2000s, and subsequently worked together in 2006 on a series of works for Carla Arocha's solo exhibitions Dirt at Kunsthalle Bern in Switzerland and Chris at the Fonds régional d’art contemporain Auvergne in Clermont-Ferrand. Their first collaborative venture was the 2007 exhibition Marauders, Monique Meloche Gallery in Chicago. As they mentioned in an interview in 2014, a central part of their collaborative process is to 'exchange ideas, which are then completed and produced together'.

Work
The work of Arocha & Schraenen is a constant enquiry on visual culture, modes of perception and, more broadly on reality itself. At the heart of their practice there is a question that remains; our place in the world and how it is manifested to us. Their practice, which simultaneously draws and distance itself from earlier modernist traditions such as Abstract art, Minimalism and Opt Art, is an investigation in the act of looking and meaning-making process. They create highly controlled site-specific installations where our subjective experiences are tested by the continuous stimulation of our sensory and cognitive capacities.

Arocha & Schraenen's work finds itself between the realm of abstraction and figuration. By altering pure abstract language, the artists introduce figurative elements and representational forms that disrupt traditional lineages and consequently open up new paths of formal and conceptual enquiry.

Arocha & Schraenen very often make use of reflective surfaces such as mirror and plexiglass that, by incorporating the surrounding space into the piece, allow them to investigate the depths of visual perception. In applying mirrored surfaces in such an unusual fashion – i.e. everyday objects and geometric forms – the pieces fracture the space and invalidate the once stable set of parameters that defined it. Reflecting surfaces spill out the space in which the pieces are places but also affect the viewer whose image is pulled apart. The artists explore all the possibilities of a space, perspective multiply and seemingly allow infinite combinations. There is a playful quality in their practice, one that tricks the eye and the expectations of the viewer.

Exhibitions (selection)

Arocha and Schraenen had their first solo exhibition in 2007 at the Monique Meloche Gallery in Chicago. After participating in the exhibitions such as Reflecting Another Space at The Agency Gallery in London, exhibition curated by Ken Pratt, and their solo exhibition Hier Waak ik at Centro de Arte Los Galpones in Caracas, exhibition curated by Jesus Fuenmayor, they became regulars on the international art scene. In 2008 were included in the Brussels Biennial curated by Barbara Vanderlinden, and in 2009 in The State of Things, and exhibition curated by Ai Wei Wei and Luc Tuymans in the BOZAR Centre for Fine Arts, Brussels, and XIV Bienal de Cuenca, Cuenca, Ecuador, Estructuras vivientes. El arte como experiencia plural, curated by Jesús Fuenmayor in 2019.

Solo exhibitions by Arocha and Schraenen (selection) 
Marauders, Monique Meloche Gallery, Chicago, 2007
The Man You Love to Hate, Koraalberg, Antwerp, 2008  
Pablo Sigg, Arocha and Schraenen. Fire Walk With Me, PETRA, Mexico City, 2007–08; travelled to Koraalberg, Antwerp 
Hier Waak Ik, Periférico Caracas | Arte Contemporáneo, Caracas, 2009 
Gloria, Vegas Gallery, London, 2009
Sequence #4, Koraalberg, Antwerp, 2010
Undertow, KaBe Contemporary, Miami, 2010
As If, Monique Meloche Gallery, Chicago, 2010
Circa Tabac The Wallace Collection, The Wallace Collection, London, 2011
After, Centro de Arte Contemporáneo de Caja de Burgos (CAB), Burgos, 2012  
The Discrepancy Between the Pale and the Dark Zone, Ganes Pratt, MALA Gallery, Ljubljana, 2012
Caraota von Moules, Künstlerhaus Bethanien, Berlin, 2012
Sunday, Wako Works of Art, Tokyo, 2013
What Now?, Galerie Isabella Czarnowska, Berlin, 2013
Looking For Clues, ltd los angeles, Los Angeles, 2013
Click, KaBe Contemporary, Miami, 2013
Persiana, Cultuurcentrum Mechelen, Mechelen, 2014
In A Rhythmic Fashion, The Croatian Academy of Arts Glypthotheque, Zagreb, 2015 
Trace, Galerie Isabella Czarnowska, Berlin, 2015 
Concrete, Parasol Unit Foundation for Contemporary Art, London, 2016
Carla Arocha and Stéphane Schraenen and Markos Dobeli: Restlessness, Galerie Isabella Czarnowska, Berlin, 2017 
Marauding in Molenbeek, and Nicolas Kozakis: Ferrari Rosso Berlinetta Pert 266154, Kusseneers Gallery, Brussels, 2017 
Tickle, The Suburban, Milwaukee, Riverwest, 2018
, Pulsar, Antwerp, 2018
Walk the Line, Galería Maior, Palma de Mallorca, 2018
The Aftermath, Gallery of Fine Arts, Split, 2019
Look Out, Galería Maior, Pollença, 2019

Solo exhibitions by Carla Arocha (selection)
Portrait: A Site-Specific Installation by Carla Preiss, El Museo del Barrio, New York, 1996
Carla Preiss: New Work, Rhona Hoffman Gallery, Chicago, 1996–1997
Gate, Hermetic Gallery, Milwaukee, 1997
Hide & Rover, Museum of Contemporary Art, Chicago 1997 
Somewhere, Cranbrook Art Museum, Bloomfield Hills, 1998
Hover: New Work, Kavi Gupta Gallery (formerly Vedanta Gallery), Chicago, 1999
Zipper, Dorothée De Pauw Gallery, Brussels, 2000
Underground, Monique Meloche Gallery, Chicago, 2001   
 Rover, Objectif Exhibitions, Antwerp, 2002
By chance, Monique Meloche Gallery, Chicago, 2003 
Smoke, Galería OMR, Mexico City, 2004
Dirt, Kunsthalle Bern, Bern, 2006
Carla Arocha (in collaboration with Stéphane Schraenen), Koraalberg, Antwerp, 2006
Chris (in collaboration with Stéphane Schraenen), Fonds régional d'art contemporain Auvergne, Clermont-Ferrand, 2006

Personal lives and other activities

In 1995, Carla Arocha met Belgium painter Luc Tuymans while he was preparing his first exhibition in the United States at The Renaissance Society in Chicago. Four years later, in 1999 she moved to Belgium, where she married Tuymans. They live and work in Antwerp.

Schraenen is the son of Guy Schraenen and Anne Marsily, founders of the publishing house Guy Schraenen éditeur and the Archive for Small Press & Communication (A.S.P.C. or ASPC), and the Galerie Kontakt, which Guy Schraenen ran from 1965 to 1978. In 1992 he started modeling for Belgium fashion designers such as, among others, Walter Van Beirendonck, Dries van Noten, Veronique Branquinho, and Nico Vandervoorst, many of which had previously studied at the Royal Academy of Fine Arts (Antwerp). From 1996 to 2006 he worked as assistant director, scenographer, production designer, graphic designer, and production manager on various exhibition, video and music projects, for example, the production coordination of the exhibition Joëlle Teurlinckx's exhibition at the Bonnefantenmuseum in Maastricht, the exhibition scenography of the Dakar Biennale, 5ème Biennale de l’Art Africain, and exhibition coordination of the exhibition Monopolis/Antwerpen at the Witte de With Center for Contemporary Art in Rotterdam.

In 2017 Arocha & Schraenen co-founded, with Luc Tuymans the artist-run non-for-profit art space CASSTL in Antwerp.

Public collections
Their individual and collective work can be found in the collections of the Museum of Modern Art, New York, NY, U.S., Museum of Contemporary Art (Chicago), IL, U.S., Museum van Hedendaagse Kunst Antwerpen (M HKA), Antwerp, Belgium, Art Institute of Chicago, Chicago, IL, U.S., Walker Art Center, Minneapolis, MN, U.S., Fonds régional d’art contemporain Auvergne, Clermont-Ferrand, France, Fonds régional d’art contemporain Bourgogne, Dijon, France, Stiftung Kunsthalle Bern, Bern, Switzerland., Boca Raton, FL, U.S., Centro de Arte Contemporáneo de Caja de Burgos (CAB), Burgos, Spain, Benedictine University Art Collection, Chicago, IL, U.S., Cisneros Fontanals Art Foundation, Miami, FL, U.S., Fundación Banco Mercantil, Caracas, Venezuela., Anglo Irish Bank, Chicago, IL, U.S., The Cisneros Fontanals Art Foundation, Miami, FL, U.S., Chicago Transit Authority (CTA), Chicago, IL, U.S., National Bank of Belgium, Brussels, Belgium.

References
Notes

Bibliography
For information about the collaborative work of Carla Arocha and Stéphane Schraenen see:
 Arocha, Carla, Schraenen Stéphane, and Kate Christina Mayne. Persiana: Carla Arocha – Stéphane Schraenen: Cultuurcentrum Mechelen. Antwerpen, Belgium: Ludion, 2014. 
 Fuemayor, Jesús. Flujo Disperso / Blurry Flux: Carla Arocha & Stéphane Schraenen Colectión Mercantil. Caracas: Mercantil Arte y Cultura A.C., 2016. 
 Pola, Francesca. Walter Leblanc.  Brussels: Mercatorfonds, 2017, 208.
 Pratt, Ken, Helen Anne Molesworth, Irmgard Hölscher, Katharina Pencz, Magda Walicka, Carla Arocha, and Stéphane Schraenen. What Now? Carla Arocha – Stephane Schraenen. Berlin: Distanz, 2013. 
 Rich, Sarah, Carla Arocha, and Stéphane Schraenen. After: Carla Arocha & Stéphane Schraenen. Burgos: Obra Social De La Caja De Burgos, 2012. 
 Soto, Jesús Rafael, and Estrellita B. Brodsky, Sarah K. Rich. Soto: Paris and beyond 1950–1970. Grey Art Gallery, New York University, 2012, 144 .

For information about the early work of Carla Arocha see:
 Molon, Dominic, C. Ondine Chavoya and Eloy J. Herández.  Carla Arocha: Orchid. New York: University of Rochester, 1995. 
 Hofmann, Irene. Carla Preiss: Somewhere. Bloomfield Hills: Cranbrook Art Museum, 1998.
 Peeters, Wim. Carla Arocha: Zipper. Brussels: Dorothée De Pauw Gallery, 2000. 
 Pirotte, Philippe and Gerrit Vermeiren. Carla Arocha: Dirt. Bern: Kunsthalle Bern, 2006.
 Vergne, Jean-Charles and Vermeiren, Gerrit. Carla Arocha: Chris. Auvergne: Fonds Régional d'Art Contemporain Auvergne, 2006.

External links
 (only works by Carla Arocha and Stéphane Schraenen)
 

Art duos
Venezuelan contemporary artists